Morry Alter is a freelance video reporter, having left WCBS New York City in 2006.

Starting his career at WCBS in September 1983 he was a feature reporter who won more than 20 Emmy awards and the Quill Award for professional achievement in the field of journalism. In late 2005 Alter was talking of retiring from the pressure of full-time reporting.  Renowned for his human interest stories he moved to a part-time reporting schedule  and, in October 2006 aged 63, he retired from WCBS.

History
Alter is a two time graduate of the University of Iowa who holds a B.A. in political science and an M.A. in journalism. His broadcast career has included stops in Davenport, Chicago, San Diego, Washington, D.C., and Miami.

Post WCBS
In March 2010, he joined Susan Cheng (environmental educator for Cornell Cooperative Extension) to host a PBS  TV special GoGreener which looked at practical, low cost ways to aid the environment.  He produces videos for companies and individuals.

References

American television journalists
American reporters and correspondents
Living people
Place of birth missing (living people)
Year of birth missing (living people)
Jewish American journalists
American male journalists
University of Iowa alumni
21st-century American Jews